Álvarez, Tamaulipas is a community located in the Nuevo Laredo Municipality in the Mexican state of Tamaulipas. According to the INEGI Census of 2010, Álvarez has a population of 1,714 inhabitants. Its elevation is 141 meters above sea level.

References 

Populated places in Tamaulipas
Laredo–Nuevo Laredo